Seatonville is a neighborhood of Louisville, Kentucky located along Seatonville Road and Echo Trail.

References

Neighborhoods in Louisville, Kentucky